Satch Worley (born June 2, 1948, Rocky Mount, Virginia) is a NASCAR Winston Cup Series driver who competed in 1974 and 1978.

Career
Satch competed in his first Cup race at the 1974 Fall Martinsville's race driving Buddy Arrington's #67 Plymouth. He started 15th and finished 9th after driveshaft problems. Satch didn't race in Cup again until driving in four races for Jack Beebe's #47 Race Hill Farm Team in 1978. In 1985, he attempted to make the Daytona 500 in a car owned by Chip Lain. He didn't make it into the starting lineup for the Daytona 500, but he did finished 3rd in the Daytona 500 consolation race. Satch competed in 5 Cup races From 1974–1978 in which he earned two top 10s. His best results were two 9th-place finishes at Martinsville in 1974 and Pocono in 1978. Total earnings for Satch Worley in the NASCAR Winston Cup Series was $7,505 ($} when adjusted for inflation). Worley started an average of 22nd and finished an average of 13th. From 1982 to 1983 Satch ran 9 Busch Series Races, with a best finish of 7th at Rockingham in 1982. Satch Competed at Bowman Gray Stadium in the 1980s, where he was a two-time track modified champion. He also raced in the NASCAR Modified Series (until the 2000 season). He earned two wins, one at Pocono in 1991, followed by a win at Martinsville in 1992.

Career results
'''NASCAR Whelen Modified Tour career statistics:

References

External links
  

1948 births
Living people
NASCAR drivers
People from Rocky Mount, Virginia
Racing drivers from Virginia